The 1999 Arun District Council election took place on 6 May 1999 to elect members of Arun District Council in West Sussex, England. The whole council was up for election and the Conservative Party held overall control of the council.

Election result

|}

Ward results

References

1999 English local elections
1999
1990s in West Sussex